Ana Maria Iuganu (born 25 February 1990) is a Romanian handballer who plays for Gloria Buzău and the Romanian national team.

Achievements 
Liga Națională:
Winner: 2019
Supercupa României:
Winner: 2018
Silver Medalist: 2014, 2016 
Cupa României:
Finalist: 2014, 2016, 2019

References

External links

 

1990 births
Living people
People from Roman, Romania
Romanian female handball players
SCM Râmnicu Vâlcea (handball) players